João Inácio de Jesus Cerqueira (born 4 November 1993 in Feira de Santana, Bahia), known as Netinho, is a Brazilian footballer.

Career

Phoenix
After spending his youth career with Santos FC in the Brazilian Serie A since the age of 14, Netinho signed for Phoenix FC of the USL Pro for their inaugural season on 5 February 2013. Then on 23 March 2013 Netinho made his debut for the franchise in their first ever game against the Los Angeles Blues in which he played the full game as Phoenix lost the match 2–0. On the following matchday, Netinho scored the first goal in Phoenix FC history, the game-winner in a 1–0 victory over VSI Tampa Bay FC.

Career statistics

Club
Statistics accurate as of August 28, 2013

References

1993 births
Living people
Brazilian footballers
People from Feira de Santana
Association football midfielders
Phoenix FC players
Expatriate soccer players in the United States
USL Championship players
Sportspeople from Bahia